From the Fires is the second EP by American rock band Greta Van Fleet. It was released on November 10, 2017 through Republic Records. From the Fires won the Grammy Award for Best Rock Album at the 61st Grammy Awards.

Background and release
From the Fires was first announced on October 25, 2017, to be released on November 10, 2017. The release consists of  eight songs; four being newly recorded by the band, four songs originally found from their EP, Black Smoke Rising.

Having chosen songs for Black Smoke Rising that would demonstrate their range and variety, the band felt that it was "simply just not finished." As a result, they compiled four more songs that they felt tied up loose ends for From the Fires. Too busy to design the cover art like they did for Black Smoke Rising, they hired an artist for From the Fires and made suggestions.

The album was released physically and digitally, the latter being available for a discount on iTunes if the account has already purchased Black Smoke Rising. The song "Highway Tune" topped  the Billboard Mainstream Rock and Active Rock charts in 2017, while "Safari Song" had peaked at number 1 on the same chart in February 2018.

Themes and composition
Lyrically, all eight songs across this album and their EP all relate to the theme of basic humanity. Specifically, vocalist Josh Kiszka explained that the album’s name and cover art were inspired by the band's camping trips of their childhood:

The album contains two covers; a cover of Sam Cooke's 1964 song "A Change Is Gonna Come", and Fairport Convention's 1968 song "Meet on the Ledge". The former was to show the band's soul influences and the latter to have a folk song. Josh and guitarist Jake had always wanted to cover "A Change Is Gonna Come", and felt that its political importance was relevant to today and therefore time to finally do it. Herschel Boone and his wife recorded multiple chorus parts to give it the effect of a choir. From the Fires two original songs, "Edge of Darkness" and "Talk on the Street," were written about nine months before its release. Jake briefly referred to the former as "pure rock and roll" and the latter as having a "catchy fun" element to it.

Reception

At Metacritic, which assigns a normalized rating out of 100 to reviews from mainstream critics, the EP received an average score of 64, which indicates "generally favorable reviews", based on 4 reviews. As of August 30, 2019, the EP has sold 500,000 copies in the U.S., giving it a gold certification by the RIAA.

Musically, the release was described as "Led Zeppelin for Generation Z", an influence the band mentioned in the past, specifically Robert Plant's wailing vocals and Jimmy Page's guitar riffs.

Track listing

Personnel
Greta Van Fleet
Joshua Kiszka – vocals
Jacob Kiszka – guitar
Samuel Kiszka – bass
Daniel Wagner – percussion

Production
Marlon Young – producer, recorder and mixer
Al Sutton – producer, recorder and mixer
Herschel Boone – vocals producer
Ashley Pawlak – cover artwork, art direction and design
Kyledidthis – art direction and design

Charts

Weekly charts

Year-end charts

Certifications

References

2017 EPs
Greta Van Fleet albums
Republic Records EPs
EPs by American artists
Rock EPs
Grammy Award for Best Rock Album